Volcano is a 2011 Icelandic drama film directed by Rúnar Rúnarsson. The film was selected as the Icelandic entry for the Best Foreign Language Film at the 84th Academy Awards, but it did not make the final shortlist. At the 2012 Edda Awards, the film was nominated in 14 categories, winning in 5. 

The film screened within many international film festivals, including the 2011 Toronto International Film Festival and the 2012 Maryland Film Festival.

Cast
 Theódór Júlíusson as Hannes
 Margrét Helga Jóhannsdóttir as Anna
 Elma Lísa Gunnarsdóttir as Telma
 Benedikt Erlingsson as Pálmi
 Þorsteinn Bachmann as Ari
 Auður Drauma Bachmann as Tinna
 Þröstur Leó Gunnarsson as Janitor

See also
 List of submissions to the 84th Academy Awards for Best Foreign Language Film
 List of Icelandic submissions for the Academy Award for Best Foreign Language Film

References

External links
 

2011 films
Films directed by Rúnar Rúnarsson
2010s Icelandic-language films
2011 drama films
Icelandic drama films